Aakatayi is a 2017 Indian Telugu-language action film directed by Rom Bhimana. Produced by K R Vijay Karan, K R Kaushal Karan, K R Anil Karan under the VKA Films, it features debutantes Aashish Raj and Rukshar Mir in the lead roles. Bollywood actress Ameesha Patel featured in an item title song. Mani Sharma composed the film's score and soundtrack. Pradeep Rawat, Suman, Ramki, Brahmanandam, Posani Krishna Murali played supporting roles.

Plot
Vikranth (Ashish Raj) is a studious engineering student who falls for Anagha (Rukshar Mir) Vikranth gets a shocker of his life when he gets to know some news about his parents through Anagha. Vikranth steps in to know the truth about his parents. Then there is the World's most wanted criminal Jehangir (Pradeep Rawat) who comes into Vikranth's life and makes it difficult for him by spoiling his things.

Cast 

Aashish Raj as Vikranth
Rukshar Dhillon as Anagha
Pradeep Rawat as Jehangir
Suman as Chandrashekhar 
Brahmanandam as Kabali
Ramki as Vikram Simha
Raasi as Vikranth's mother
Posani Krishna Murali as Politician 
 Ajay Ghosh as Beeku
Nagendra Babu as Police officer
Prudhviraj as Pawan Kalyan fan
 Srinivasa Reddy
Ameesha Patel in item number

Production 
Shooting began on 25 July 2016

Soundtrack
The Music Was Composed By Mani Sharma and Released by Aditya Music.

Release 
The teaser was released on 21 January 2017. The film was released on 10 March 2017. The soundtrack was released on 8 February 2017 on Aditya Music.

Critical reception

References

External links
 

2017 films
Films scored by Mani Sharma
2010s Telugu-language films
Films about terrorism in India
Indian action comedy films
2017 masala films
Indian films about revenge
Films set in universities and colleges
2017 action comedy films